The 2016–17 Premier League Tournament Tier B was the second division of the 29th season of first-class cricket in Sri Lanka's Premier Trophy. The tournament was contested by nine teams, starting on 2 December 2016 and concluding on 29 January 2017. Sri Lanka Ports Authority Cricket Club joined the division after they were relegated from the 2015–16 Tier A tournament.

Panadura Sports Club finished top of the table, but it was runners-up Sri Lanka Ports Authority Cricket Club who secured promotion to Tier A due to a match-fixing scandal that resulted in the match between Panadura SC and Kalutara Physical Culture Club played on 23–25 January 2017 being declared null and void.

Points table

 Promoted to Tier A

Matches

Round 1

Round 2

Round 3

Round 4

Round 5

Round 6

Round 7

Round 8

Round 9

Round 10

Notes

See also
 2016–17 Premier League Tournament Tier A

References

External links
 Series home at ESPN Cricinfo

Premier League Tournament Tier B
Premier League Tournament Tier B
Premier League Tournament Tier B